Edmed is a surname. Notable people with the surname include:

Dick Edmed (1904–1984), English footballer
Steve Edmed (born 1968), Australian rugby league player
Tane Edmed, Australian rugby union player

Surnames of English origin